AFK Neris Vilnius was a Lithuanian football team from the city of Vilnius.

In 1991 it was known as Vilnius Makabi, and supported by the Lithuanian Sports Club Makabi. The club dissolved in 1994.

Participation in Lithuanian Championships
 1992–93 – 11th
 1991–92 – 6th
 1991 – 2nd
 1990 – 11th

Season-by-season

 Lithuania
{|class="wikitable"
|-bgcolor="#efefef"
! Season
! Div.
! Pos.
! Pl.
! W
! D
! L
! Goals
! P
! Top Scorer
!Cup
!colspan=2|Europe

|-
|align=center|1991
|align=center|1st
|align=center bgcolor=silver|2
|align=center|14
|align=center|8
|align=center|5
|align=center|1
|align=center|17–5
|align=center|21
|align=center|
|align=center|
|align=center|
|align=left|

|}

References

Defunct football clubs in Lithuania
Association football clubs disestablished in 1994
Association football clubs established in 1966
1966 establishments in Lithuania
Jewish football clubs